Osku Kuutamo is a Finnish male wheelchair curler and curling coach.

Teams

Record as a coach of national teams

References

External links

Living people
Finnish male curlers
Finnish wheelchair curlers
Finnish curling coaches
Year of birth missing (living people)
Place of birth missing (living people)
21st-century Finnish people